Peter L. McCreath,  (born July 5, 1943) is former chairman of the Nova Scotia Liquor Corporation, President of PMC Communications Inc. and a former Canadian politician.

Biography
A journalist and teacher by training, McCreath was elected to the House of Commons of Canada in the 1988 election as the Progressive Conservative Member of Parliament for the Nova Scotia riding of South Shore.

In 1991, he became Parliamentary Secretary to the Minister of State for Finance and Privatization. In 1993, he was appointed Parliamentary Secretary to the Minister of Industry, Science and Technology and to the Minister for International Trade.

When Kim Campbell succeeded Brian Mulroney as PC Party leader and Prime Minister of Canada, she appointed McCreath to Cabinet as Minister of Veterans Affairs. However, McCreath's cabinet career was short-lived as both he and the Campbell government were defeated in the subsequent 1993 general election.

Following his defeat, McCreath turned to business entering the field of public affairs, communications and government relations. After 5 years with CIBC, he established his own company, PMC Communications Inc.

McCreath became Founding Chairman of the Nova Scotia Liquor Corporation in 2001. During the past 8 years he has led the transformation of the NSLC into leading and award winning Canadian retail organization and one of Canada's most profitable crown corporations.

McCreath has written several books, is a co-author of the history textbooks Discovering Canada, Canadian History: Voices and Vision, has authored a biography, The Life & Times of Alexander Keith, Nova Scotia's Brewmaster (2001), A History of Early Nova Scotia (1982 with John G. Leefe), The People's Choice (about life as an MP – 1995), Exquisite Destinations: Adventures of a Maritimer in Lesser-Known Places (2018). From Columbus to Louisbourg: The Colonial Evolution of Atlantic Canada and New England (2020), and "Le Loutre: Acadia's Warrior Priest" (2021).

Electoral record

References

External links

1943 births
Living people
Canadian educators
Canadian people of Scottish descent
Journalists from Nova Scotia
Members of the 25th Canadian Ministry
Members of the House of Commons of Canada from Nova Scotia
Members of the King's Privy Council for Canada
People from Halifax, Nova Scotia
Progressive Conservative Party of Canada MPs